This page is the comprehensive discography of American rock and roll musician Johnny Rivers.

Studio albums

1960s albums

1970s albums

1980s albums

1990s albums

2000s albums

Live albums

Compilation albums

Singles

1950s singles

1960s singles

1970s singles

1980s singles

2000s singles

2010s singles

References

External links
 

Discographies of American artists